Trains and Boats and Planes is an EP released on Diesel Only Records by Laura Cantrell on April 15, 2008. It is a concept EP centered on the theme of traveling, as exemplified by the title track (a cover of the song of the same name by Burt Bacharach and Hal David). In total, six songs (out of nine) on this EP are covers, including the title track.

Track listing
"Trains and Boats and Planes" (Burt Bacharach, Hal David) – 4:14
"Train of Life" (Robert S. Riley, Roger Miller) – 2:49
"The Wreck of the Edmund Fitzgerald" (Gordon Lightfoot) – 6:25
"Howard Hughes Blues" (John Hartford) – 3:37
"Love Vigilantes" (Bernard Sumner, Gillian Gilbert, Peter Hook, Stephen Morris) – 4:18	
"Silver Wings" – 4:22
"Roll Truck Roll" (Roy Pennington) – 2:38	
"Big Wheel" (Laura Cantrell) – 2:30
"Yonder Comes a Freight Train" (Jay Sherman-Godfrey, Jeremy Tepper) – 3:21

References

2008 EPs
Laura Cantrell albums
Diesel Only Records albums